Ryan Mitchell Duffy (born 25 March 1991), is a New Zealand cricketer who played for Otago between the 2013/14 and 2016/17 seasons.

Duffy was born at Frankton in 1991 and is the older brother of Jacob Duffy who has played for Otago and for the New Zealand national cricket team. He made his senior debut for Otago in a Plunket Shield match against Canterbury in November 2013, opening the batting and scoring 18 and 16 not out in the match. He went on to play 18 first-class, four List A and two Twenty20 matches for the side, his final appearances coming in the Ford Trophy in January 2017.

Primarily a wicket-keeper batsman, Duffy scored a single century, making 104 runs against Wellington in March 2016. He bowled occasionally, taking a wicket in each of his Twenty20 matches. He has played club cricket for Kaikorai Cricket Club and in the Hawke Cup played for Southland between 2009/10 and 2019/20. He played for a New Zealand XI in a warm up match for the touring Bangladesh side in December 2016.

References

External links 

1991 births
Living people
New Zealand cricketers
Otago cricketers